The Rachel Alexandra Stakes is a Grade II American Thoroughbred horse race for three-year-old fillies at a distance of one and one sixteenth miles on the dirt run annually in February at Fair Grounds Race Course in New Orleans, Louisiana.  The event currently offers a purse of $300,000.

History

The inaugural running of the event was on 6 March 1982 as the Davona Dale Stakes over a distance of one mile and forty yards and was won by Windfields Farm's Laura North who was trained by US Hall of Fame trainer Grover G. Delp and ridden by jockey Ronald Franklin in a time of 1:42. 

The event was named in honor of Calumet Farm's champion homebred filly Davona Dale, foaled in 1976 was U.S. Champion Three-Year-Old Filly after winning the Grade I Kentucky Oaks and sweeping the New York Triple Tiara series: the Acorn Stakes, the Mother Goose Stakes, and the Coaching Club American Oaks. Davona Dale was inducted into the National Museum of Racing and Hall of Fame in 1985. Today Davona Dale continues to have an event named for her as the GII Davona Dale Stakes at Gulfstream Park in Hallandale Beach, Florida.

The event became a preparatory event for the Fair Grounds Oaks and was scheduled after the Thelma Stakes (today known as the Letellier Memorial Stakes for two-year-olds held in December) which was run over the six-furlong distance.

In 1985 the distance of the event was increased to one and one sixteenth miles and the winner Marshua's Echelon also was victorious in winning both the Thelma Stakes and the Fair Grounds Oaks.

The following year Tiffany Lass repeated Marshua's Echelon achievements and then continued with her undefeated streak winning the GI Fantasy Stakes at Oaklawn Park and the GI Kentucky Oaks. Although Tiffany Lass would not race in the second half of 1986 her performances were substantial enough to land her U.S. Champion Three-Year-Old Filly honors for the year.

In 1999 the American Graded Stakes Committee upgraded the classification of the event to Grade III. For the first running as a graded event, the US Champion Two-Year-Old Filly and Breeders' Cup Juvenile Fillies winner Silverbulletday from 1998 entered and began her three-year-old campaign in the event. Starting at short odds of 1/10 Silverbulletday faced seven other fillies and won the event by  lengths. Silverbulletday would go on an win another seven more events of which four were Grade I and be crowned  US Champion Three-Year-Old Filly of 1999.    

In 2001, a year after Silverbulletday retired Fair Grounds track administration renamed the event to the Silverbulletday Stakes.

In 2002 running of the event Take Charge Lady equaled the track record in winning by  lengths in a time of 1:42.09. 

In 2003 the event was upgraded to Grade II status but this only was until 2005 when it was downgraded back to Grade III.

Due to the catastrophic damage caused by of Hurricane Katrina to the Fair Ground Race Course in 2005 the event was held at Louisiana Downs in 2006.

In 2010 Fair Grounds track administration renamed the event again to the Rachel Alexandra Stakes in honor of the 2009 American Horse of the Year, Rachel Alexandra. Rachel Alexandra had won the Fair Grounds Oaks in 2009 during her exceptional campaign that won her the Eclipse Award.

In 2016 the event was upgraded from Grade III to Grade II status. In 2020, the purse was increased to $300,000.

The Rachel Alexandra Stakes is part of the Road to the Kentucky Oaks and has produced multiple winners of that race, including Monomoy Girl (2018) and Serengeti Empress (2019).

Records
Speed  record:
  miles: 1:42.09 – Take Charge Lady (2002) 

Margins:
 11 lengths – Out of the Bid (1987)

Most wins by a jockey:
 3 - Kenneth Bourque (1984, 1987, 1991)
 3 - Ronald Ardoin (1993, 1994, 1998)

Most wins by a trainer:
 6 - Steven Asmussen (2005, 2007, 2009, 2014, 2020, 2021)

Most wins by an owner:
 4 - Winchell Thoroughbreds  (2005, 2009, 2014, 2020)

Rachel Alexandra Stakes – Fair Grounds Oaks double:
Marshua's Echelon  †(1985), Tiffany Lass  †(1986), Prospectors Delite †(1992), Blushing K. D.  †(1997), Silverbulletday †(1999), Shawnee Country ‡(2000), Take Charge Lady ‡(2002), Summerly ‡(2005), Untapable (2014), I'm a Chatterbox (2015), Farrell (2017)

Notes:

† Rachel Alexandra Stakes was known as the Davona Dale Stakes

‡ Rachel Alexandra Stakes was known as the Silverbulletday Stakes

Winners

Notes:

§ Ran as an entry

See also
List of American and Canadian Graded races
Road to the Kentucky Oaks

References

Fair Grounds Race Course
Flat horse races for three-year-old fillies
Graded stakes races in the United States
Horse races in New Orleans
Horse racing
Recurring sporting events established in 1982
1982 establishments in Louisiana
Grade 2 stakes races in the United States